Calyptra orthograpta is a moth of the  family Erebidae. It has been found in China and India. It has been noted to be a relatively rare species.

References

Calpinae
Moths of Japan
Moths described in 1886